Caligula anna is a moth of the family Saturniidae. It is found in south-eastern and southern Asia, including China.

See also
 Saturniidae
 List of moths of India (Saturniidae)

Caligula (moth)
Moths described in 1865
Moths of Asia
Taxa named by Frederic Moore